The Yakö language, Lokö (Lokaa), is the Upper Cross River language of the Yakö people (Yakurr) of Nigeria.

References

Languages of Nigeria
Upper Cross River languages